Jamie Richards may refer to:
 Jamie Richards (footballer)
 Jamie Richards (horse trainer)
 Jamie Richards (cyclist)

See also
 James Richards (disambiguation)